Natalia Viktorovna Nikitina (born 20 January 1996) is a Russian handball player who plays for Zvezda Zvenigorod in the Russian Super League.

She also represented Russia in the 2016 Women's Junior World Handball Championship, placing as runners-up.

Achievements
Russian Super League
Silver Medalist: 2016
Bronze Medalist: 2015
Russian Cup:
Winner: 2016
Bronze Medalist: 2019
World Junior Championship:
Silver Medalist: 2016
European Junior Championship:
Silver Medalist: 2015

References

Weblinks 
 Profile on the Russian Handball Federation
 Profile at Zvezda Zvdenigorod

1996 births
Living people
Russian female handball players
People from Almaty